The chapters of the ongoing Japanese shōjo manga series Skip Beat! are written and illustrated by Yoshiki Nakamura. It is the story of Kyōko Mogami, a 16-year-old girl who discovers her childhood friend, Shō Fuwa, who is an aspiring pop idol as well as the boy she loves, only keeps her around to act as a maid and earn money. Furious and heartbroken, she vows to get revenge by beating him in show business. In Japan, the manga was first published in Hakusensha's shōjo manga anthology Hana to Yume in February 2002, while in the United States, it began publishing under Viz Media's Shojo Beat label in 2006. As of June 20, 2022, 48 volumes and one fanbook have been released in Japan, and as of April 5, 2022, 46 volumes have been released in the United States. Viz Media began re-issuing the Skip Beat! manga series in a 3-in-1 VIZBIG EDITION in March 2012, and as of December 2020, 14 volumes have been released.

Volume list

References

Skip Beat!